Piz Beverin is a mountain of the Lepontine Alps, overlooking Thusis in the canton of Graubünden. A trail leads to the summit.

References

External links

 Piz Beverin on Hikr

Mountains of the Alps
Mountains of Switzerland
Mountains of Graubünden
Lepontine Alps
Two-thousanders of Switzerland
Thusis
Safiental
Tschappina